Cheryl Patrice Derricotte  is an American visual artist  working mostly with glass and paper. She lives and works in San Francisco, California.

Early life and education
Derricotte is originally from Washington, DC.

She holds a Master of Fine Arts from the California Institute of Integral Studies (CIIS), a Master of Regional Planning from Cornell University, and a B.A. in Urban Affairs from Barnard College, Columbia University.

Artwork 
Derricotte describes her artwork process as:Identities shaped by home (or homelessness); natural beauty (or disasters), memories of happiness (or loss) inspire my artwork. This results in works on glass and paper.  Both materials are translucent and seemingly fragile, yet they are hearty enough to survive the passage of time between civilizations.

I make art from research. This type of inquiry also leads me not just to economic but also environmental concerns. Observations of current events, politics, and urban landscapes are my entry into these issues.

She has exhibited in galleries, museums and art spaces. Her first solo exhibition in 2016, Ghosts/Ships, held at the Museum of the African Diaspora in San Francisco, "offers a glimpse into the global African slave trade that is both subtle and direct in its links between past and present." In 2019 she was part of the “Ancestral Journeys” exhibition at the Euphrat Museum of Art, an exhibition which "spotlights self-identity, family history, immigration, and diasporas..."

Awards 
Her awards include a San Francisco Individual Artist Commission; Hemera Foundation Tending Space Fellowship for Artists; the Rick and Val Beck Scholarship for Glass; Emerging Artist at the Museum of the African Diaspora; Gardarev Center Fellow; Art Alliance for Contemporary Glass’ Visionary Scholarship, D.C. Commission on the Arts & Humanities/ National Endowment for the Arts Artist Fellowship Grant, San Francisco Individual Artist Commission, and a Puffin Foundation Grant.  She was a Finalist for the LEAP Award in 2016.

Arts activist 
Derricotte is the current Secretary/The Minister of Information for Three Point Nine Art Collective, a group of San Francisco area Black artists. She is also the Chief Mindfulness Officer of Crux, a U.S. nationwide cooperative of Black artists "working at the intersection of art and technology through immersive storytelling (Virtual Reality)." She has also been part of moderated discussions and talks "responding to representations of race and identity."

References

External links 

 Cheryl Derricotte Website

20th-century American printmakers
Artists from Washington, D.C.
African-American contemporary artists
American contemporary artists
African-American culture
21st-century American printmakers
20th-century African-American artists
American glass artists
Women glass artists
Artists from San Francisco
African-American women artists
Cornell University alumni
Barnard College alumni
Year of birth missing (living people)
Living people
American women printmakers
20th-century American women artists
21st-century American women artists
African-American printmakers
20th-century African-American women
21st-century African-American women
21st-century African-American artists